Archibald Read Richardson FRS (21 August 1881 – 4 November 1954) was a British mathematician known for his work in algebra.

Career
Richardson collaborated with Dudley E. Littlewood on invariants and group representation theory.  They introduced the immanant of a matrix, studied Schur functions and developed the Littlewood–Richardson rule for their multiplication.

Awards and honours
Richardson was elected a Fellow of the Royal Society on 21 March 1946.

See also
Quasideterminant

References

1881 births
1954 deaths
20th-century British mathematicians
Algebraists
Fellows of the Royal Society